Gillette Cup is the name given to the New Zealand Secondary Schools boys one day cricket competition. The competition begins as a knock-out competition until the top school in each of six regional zones is determined.  These schools then contest a final held in Christchurch in December.  The Gillette Cup was first played in 1990.

Participants 
The numbers of teams entered has increased fairly steadily from 75 in 1990 to 198 schools entering the 2013 competition. Regionwise the teams entered in 2013 were:

 Auckland (36)
 Northern Districts (51)
 Central Districts (41)
 Wellington (17)
 Canterbury (28)
 Otago (27)

Winners of the Gillette Cup
Winners of the Gillette Cup:

1990: Palmerston North Boys' High School
1991:  St. Kentigern College
1992: Otago Boys' High School
1993: Otago Boys' High School
1994: Whangarei Boys' High School
1995: Wanganui Collegiate School
1996: St. Patrick's College, Silverstream
1997: Wanganui Collegiate School
1998: Palmerston North Boys' High School
1999: King's College and Christchurch Boys' High School (tied)
2000: Auckland Grammar School
2001: Wellington College
2002: Hamilton Boys' High School
2003: Hamilton Boys' High School
2004: Palmerston North Boys' High School and King's College (tied)
2005: Christchurch Boys' High School and Tauranga Boys' College (tied)
2006: Christchurch Boys' High School and King's College (tied)
2007: Christchurch Boys' High School
2008: Hamilton Boys' High School
2009: Christchurch Boys' High School
2010: King's College
2011: King's College
2012: Christchurch Boys' High School
2013: Christchurch Boys' High School
2014: Christchurch Boys' High School
2015: Hutt International Boys' School
2016: Christchurch Boys' High School
2017: Christchurch Boys' High School
2018: Wellington College
2019: St. Andrew's College
2022: Christ's College, Christchurch

Top Schools

Winners of the Gillette Cup:

 Christchurch Boys' High School: 10
 King's College: 5
 Hamilton Boys' High School: 3
 Palmerston North Boys' High School: 3
 Otago Boys' High School: 2
 Wanganui Collegiate School: 2
 Wellington College: 2
 Auckland Grammar School: 1
 St. Andrew's College: 1
 St. Kentigern College: 1
 St. Patrick's College, Silverstream: 1
 Tauranga Boys' College: 1
 Whangarei Boys' High School: 1
 Hutt International Boys' School: 1
 Christ's College: 1

Based on attendance at the National Final, the top schools in New Zealand are:

1: Palmerston North Boys' High School (16)
2: Otago Boys' High School (13)
3 Christchurch Boys' High School (12)
3: King's College (11)
5: Hamilton Boys' High School (8)
5: Wanganui Collegiate School (8)
7: Tauranga Boys' College (6)
8: Wellington College (4)
8: Whangarei Boys' High School (3)
10: New Plymouth Boys' High School (3)
10: Rathkeale College (3)
10: St Kentigern College (3)
10: St. Patrick's College, Silverstream (3)
10: St Paul's Collegiate School (3)
10: Westlake Boys High School (3)

References

External links
 Gillette Cup - Fixtures & Results - New Zealand Cricket

New Zealand domestic cricket competitions